Lyngbyatoxin-a is a cyanotoxin produced by certain cyanobacteria species, most notably Moorea producens (formerly Lyngbya majuscula). It is produced as defense mechanism to ward off any would-be predators of the bacterium, being a potent blister agent as well as carcinogen. Low concentrations cause a common skin condition known as seaweed dermatitis.

Biosynthesis 

Lyngbyatoxin is a terpenoid indole alkaloid that belongs to the class of non-ribosomal peptides (NRP). Lyngbyatoxin contains a nucleophilic indole ring that takes part in the activation of protein kinases. Figure 1, shows the biosynthesis of Lyngbyatoxin reported by Neilan et al. and Gerwick et al. The non-ribosomal peptide synthase (NRPS) LtxA protein condenses L-methyl-valine and L-tryptophan to form the linear dipeptide N-methyl-L-valyl-L-tryptophan. The latter is released via a NADPH-dependent reductive cleavage to form the aldehyde which is subsequently reduced to the corresponding alcohol. Then LtxB which is a P450-dependent monooxygenase serves as a catalyst in the oxidation and subsequent cyclization of N-methyl-L-valyl-L-tryptophan. Finally, LtxC which is a reverse prenyltransferase performs the transfer of a geranyl pyrophosphate (GPP) to carbon-7 of the indole ring which is accompanied by the lost of pyrophosphate.

References 

Indole alkaloids
Cyanotoxins
Blister agents
Bacterial alkaloids